Aimo Johan Kustaa Tukiainen (1917–1996) was a sculptor from Finland. His best-known work is the Equestrian statue of Marshal Mannerheim in Helsinki.

Tukiainen's wide and versatile production mainly consists of a large amount of monumental works, portraits, medals and small sculptures.

Tukiainen played a central role in the Finnish art world of 20th century. In addition to his artist's career he chaired both the Artists' Association of Finland and the Association of Finnish Sculptors.

In 1962, Tukiainen bought a property caller Purnu in Orivesi near place of birth and made it his summer atelier. In 1967, he invited his six fellow artist to organize a summer exhibition to celebrate their 50th birthday. The summer exhibitions were organized then roughly every second year. The original group had also their 60th and 75th birthday exhibitions there.

Photos of Tukiainen's works

References

External links 
 Aimo Tukiainen loi Marskille muodon. Tukiainen interview in Finnish television 1962 

1917 births
1996 deaths
20th-century Finnish sculptors